Microdracoides is a monotypic genus of flowering plants belonging to the family Cyperaceae. The only species is Microdracoides squamosa.

Its native range is Western and Western Central Tropical Africa.

References

Cyperaceae
Cyperaceae genera
Monotypic Poales genera